Mark Gatha is a retired Canadian voice actor who worked at Blue Water Studios from 2002 to 2006. He is best known for voicing Domon Kasshu in the anime G Gundam and X from the Mega Man X video game series. He is also heard in the anime Zoids: Chaotic Century, providing the voice of Irvine.

According to the Megaman Network site, Gatha is no longer working in voice over. According to Lucas Gilbertson through his YouTube account, he trained to be an orthopedic surgeon in St. John's, Newfoundland and Labrador and is now working in the Vancouver area.

Filmography

Animation/anime roles
Benjamin Blümchen - Billy Ballo
 Betterman - Cactus
 D.I.C.E. - Captain Spike
 Fancy Lala - Gameshow Director, Imaichi
 Flame of Recca - Minamio, Saiha, additional voices.
 Hoop Days - Kazuhiko Aikawa
 Mega Man Maverick Hunter X: The Day of Sigma - X
 Mega Man X Legacy Collection - X (OVA Episode: The Day of Sigma)
 Mobile Fighter G Gundam - Domon Kasshu
 Mobile Suit Zeta Gundam - Mezun Mecks
 Stark Raven - Carmine
 Zoids: Chaotic Century - Irvine

Video game roles
 D.I.C.E. - Captain Spike
 Mega Man X8 - X
 Mega Man X Command Mission - X
 Mega Man Maverick Hunter X - X
 Mega Man X Legacy Collection - X (X8; archive footage)
 Mega Man Battle Network 5: Double Team DS - Lan Hikari
 Battle Assault 3 featuring Gundam Seed - Domon Kasshu
 Gundam: Battle Assault 2 - Domon Kasshu
 Mobile Suit Gundam: Zeonic Front - Lt. Agar

Live action roles
 Honey, I Shrunk the Kids: The TV Show - Don Cuervo (Episode: "Honey, It's Gloom and Doom")

References

External links

Canadian male video game actors
Canadian male voice actors
Living people
Year of birth missing (living people)